The Division of Wakefield was an Australian electoral division in the state of South Australia. The seat was a hybrid rural-urban electorate that stretched from Salisbury in the outer northern suburbs of Adelaide at the south of the seat right through to the Clare Valley at the north of the seat, 135 km from Adelaide. It included the suburbs of Elizabeth, Craigmore, Munno Para, and part of Salisbury, and the towns of Balaklava, Clare, Freeling, Gawler, Kapunda, Mallala, Riverton, Tarlee, Virginia, Williamstown, and part of Port Wakefield.

The division was named after Edward Gibbon Wakefield, who promoted colonisation as a tool for social engineering, plans which formed the basis for settlements in South Australia, Western Australia, New Zealand and Canada. The division was one of the seven established when the multi-member Division of South Australia was redistributed into single-member seats on 2 October 1903. At the 1903 federal election, the division (on very different boundaries) was won unopposed by the sitting speaker (following traditional Westminster convention), running as an independent. It was first contested by more than one candidate at the 1906 election. Two of the seat's former members of particular note have been the inaugural Speaker of the House and two-time Premier of South Australia, Frederick Holder, and Howard government two-term Speaker Neil Andrew.

Wakefield was abolished in 2019, following a redistribution triggered by a change in representation entitlement which saw South Australia's seats in the House of Representatives reduced to ten. The division has been mostly replaced by the Division of Spence.

1903 - 2004

For a hundred years, Wakefield covered large rural areas of South Australia and at times all the way to the borders of Northern Territory and Queensland, and was held by the Liberal Party and its predecessors for all but five years from 1903 to 2004. For most of that time, it was a safely conservative seat.  Labor only succeeded in winning it twice, at a 1938 by-election and the 1943 federal election.

In its final configuration as an exclusively rural seat, it stretched from the Yorke Peninsula in the west to the New South Wales border in the east, and included much of the Riverland.  It covered the towns of Angaston, Balaklava, Barmera Berri, Gawler, Gumeracha, Kadina, Kapunda, Loxton, Minlaton, Moonta, Morgan, Mount Pleasant, Nuriootpa, Renmark, Tanunda, Waikerie, Wallaroo and Yorketown.

Final Configurations 2004 - 2019
The seat's character was dramatically altered by a redistribution prior to the 2004 election. Bonython, a comfortably safe Labor seat based on the outer northern suburbs of Adelaide, was abolished, and Wakefield was pushed well to the south to absorb much of Bonython's territory. In the process, Wakefield lost much of its vast rural territory, which went to Grey and Barker. This resulted in a seat covering only 6,407 km²,  roughly a fifth of its pre-2004 extent of 31,841 km².

Neil Andrew, the seat's member since 1983, had previously held the old rural Wakefield with a comfortably safe majority of 14.6 percent. However, the new hybrid urban-rural (though still classed rural) Wakefield became a marginal Labor seat with a notional 1.3 percent two-party margin. Andrew believed this made Wakefield impossible to hold and retired.  However, David Fawcett retained it for the Liberals in 2004 with a 0.7 percent two-party margin, defeating the former member for Bonython, Martyn Evans.

At the 2007 election, Nick Champion became only the third Labor member ever to win Wakefield, with a 6.6 percent two-party margin. At the 2010 election, Champion made it a safe Labor seat on paper by winning a 12 percent two-party margin.  He became the first Labor member to be re-elected to Wakefield, and the second to be elected for a full term. The South Australian federal redistribution in 2011 had the greatest impact on Wakefield where the Labor margin declined by 1.5 percent. Champion retained it at the 2013 election on a 3.4 percent two-party margin even as Labor lost government, marking the first time the non-Labor parties won government at an election without winning Wakefield. Champion increased his two-party margin at the 2016 election to 11 percent, again making Wakefield a safe Labor seat on paper.

Under the electoral redistribution completed in 2018 the adjoining Division of Port Adelaide was abolished, Wakefield was renamed Spence in honour of Catherine Helen Spence, and became a seat based on Adelaide's outer northern metropolitan local government councils of City of Playford , Town of Gawler and northern part of the City of Salisbury. The remaining non metropolitan rural portions were transferred to the Divisions of Grey and Barker..The newly named Division of Spence overlapped the final configuration of the former Division of Bonython before it was abolished prior to the 2004 election.

Members

Election results

See also
 2016 Australian federal election
 Results of the Australian federal election, 2016 (South Australia)

References
 ABC profile for Wakefield: 2016
 Poll Bludger profile for Wakefield: 2016
 AEC profile for Wakefield: 2016

Notes

External links
 SA boundary map, 2001: AEC
 SA boundary map, 1984: Atlas SA
  (includes link to 2011 map)

Former electoral divisions of Australia
Constituencies established in 1903
Constituencies disestablished in 2019
1903 establishments in Australia
2019 disestablishments in Australia